Kosmos 672 ( meaning Cosmos 672) was the second uncrewed test of the ASTP Soyuz spacecraft. Also had APAS-75 androgynous docking system.

This was preceded by another uncrewed test of this spacecraft type, Kosmos 638. It was a Soyuz 7K-TM spacecraft.

Mission parameters
Spacecraft: Soyuz 7K-TM
Mass: 6510 to 6680 kg
Crew: None
Launched: August 12, 1974
Landed: August 18, 1974

References
Mir Hardware Heritage
Mir Hardware Heritage - NASA report (PDF format)
Mir Hardware Heritage (wikisource)

Kosmos 0672
1974 in the Soviet Union
Spacecraft launched in 1974
Soyuz uncrewed test flights
Apollo–Soyuz Test Project